Kossaki may refer to the following places:
Kossaki, Masovian Voivodeship (east-central Poland)
Kossaki, Kolno County in Podlaskie Voivodeship (north-east Poland)
Kossaki, Łomża County in Podlaskie Voivodeship (north-east Poland)